Street of Temptation is a 1962 West German drama film directed by Imo Moszkowicz and starring Mario Adorf, Karin Baal and Johanna von Koczian.

Cast
 Mario Adorf as Joe
 Karin Baal as Nina
 Johanna von Koczian as Valentina
 Amedeo Nazzari as Herr im seidenen Anzug
 Wolfgang Wahl as Marcello
 Paul Muller as Dr. Salvatori
 Lotte Ledl as Marisa
 Gretl Schörg as Rita
 Carola Rasch as Elvira
 Wolfgang Völz as Knut
 Olive Moorefield as Sängerin im Paradiso

See also
 Sliding Doors (1998)

References

Bibliography 
 Bock, Hans-Michael & Bergfelder, Tim. The Concise CineGraph. Encyclopedia of German Cinema. Berghahn Books, 2009.

External links 
 

1962 films
1962 drama films
German drama films
West German films
1960s German-language films
Films directed by Imo Moszkowicz
Films set in Italy
Alternate timeline films
1960s German films